Ernie Toshack was a member of Donald Bradman's famous Australian cricket team, which toured England in 1948 and was undefeated in their 34 matches. This unprecedented feat by a Test side touring England earned Bradman's men the sobriquet The Invincibles.

A left-arm medium-pace seam bowler, Toshack was a member of the first-choice team, and played in the first four Test matches before succumbing to a persistent knee injury. Toshack contained the English batsmen with leg theory in between the new ball bursts of Keith Miller and Ray Lindwall. He took 11 wickets in the Tests; his most notable performance was the 5/40 he took in the second innings of the Second Test at Lord's. However, his knee failed in the first innings of the Fourth Test when he took 1/112. He was unable to bowl in the second innings and missed the Fifth Test, marking the end of his Test career.

For the entire tour, Toshack took 50 first-class wickets at a bowling average of 21.12 with four five-wicket innings hauls, including a best of 7/81 against Yorkshire at Bramall Lane. He also took 6/51 in the first innings of the match against the Marylebone Cricket Club, who were almost entirely represented by English Test cricketers, playing a key part in an innings victory. With little batting ability, Toshack usually batted last in Australia's line-up and scored 78 runs at a batting average of 8.66, the worst first-class aggregate and average among the tourists. However, in the Tests, he was dismissed only once and averaged 51.00 with a series of tail-wagging performances, including his career best of 20 not out.

Background
A left-arm medium-pacer, Toshack made his first-class cricket debut in the 1945–46 upon the resumption of cricket after World War II. His performances were enough to ensure his selection for the tour of New Zealand in early 1946, where Toshack made his Test debut in the one-off match against the hosts' national team. From then on, Toshack was a regular member of the national team and played in every Test over the next two summers, fitness permitting. Toshack played in eight of the 11 Tests during this period, taking 36 wickets. Towards the end of the Test series against India in 1947–48 in Australia, knee injuries began to hamper Toshack, and he was in doubt for the 1948 tour of England. He only made the trip after a 3–2 majority vote by a medical panel, despite being one of the first players chosen by the selectors on cricketing merit. Two Melbourne doctors ruled him unfit, but three specialists from his home state of New South Wales presented a more optimistic outlook; this allowed him to tour. As a member of Bradman's Invincibles, the tour was to immortalise him in cricketing history. He grew tired of signing autographs during the sea voyage to England, and entrusted a friend with the task. However, his friend was unaware of the correct spelling of his name; as a result, there are still sheets in circulation signed Toshak. The team manager Keith Johnson gave Toshack a talking to over this incident.

Early tour matches
Australia traditionally fielded its first-choice team in the tour opener, which was customarily against Worcestershire. Toshack was included, reinforcing the new ball attack of Lindwall and Miller and the off spin and leg spin of Ian Johnson and Colin McCool respectively. Australia bowled first, and Toshack took two quick wickets to reduce the hosts to 3/158 after a 137-run second wicket partnership. Toshack ended with 2/39 as Australia dismissed Worcestershire for 233. He was not required to bat as Australia made 8/462 declared, and then took 1/40 in the second innings as the tourists started their campaign with an innings victory, setting the tone for the summer.

Toshack was then rested for the second tour match against Leicestershire, which Australia won by an innings. He then missed the next match against Yorkshire, as Australia came closest to losing a match on the tour, scraping home by four wickets on a damp wicket.

Toshack returned as the Australians travelled to London to play Surrey at The Oval, and he had his first outing with the bat on English soil, coming in last and scoring eight to help wicket-keeper Don Tallon add 33 for the final wicket before Australia were bowled out for 632. Toshack bowled without success in the first innings and took one wicket in the second innings, that of Arthur McIntyre, to end with match figures of 1/54 as Surrey were defeated by an innings. Toshack then took 2/32 in the first innings against Cambridge University, and did not bat as Australia declared at 4/414. He then took 0/9 from eight overs in the second innings, as Australia completed another innings victory. He then played in the match against Essex where Australia made 721 runs on the first day to set a new world record for the most runs scored in a day of first-class cricket. However, Toshack only contributed four runs batting at No. 11. In the first innings, Toshack took the last five wickets to fall, including the top-scorer Ray Smith for 25, ending with 5/31 from 10.5 overs as the hosts capitulated for 83, unable to cope with his swing. Australia enforced the follow on and Toshack took a further 2/50 in the second innings as Australia won by an innings and 451 runs, the largest margin of the tour. He then faced Oxford University, scoring two runs in Australia's 431. Toshack then took three lower order wickets in the first innings to end with 3/34 from 22 overs, sending down more overs than any other Australian. He took 3/37 in the second innings as Australia completed another innings victory after enforcing the follow on. The Oxford batsmen had trouble with the seam movement of Toshack.

Toshack was retained for the match against the Marylebone Cricket Club at Lord's. The MCC fielded seven players who would represent England in the Tests, and were basically a full strength Test team, while Australia fielded their first-choice team. It was a chance to gain a psychological advantage, with Len Hutton, Denis Compton and Bill Edrich, three of England's first four batsmen in the Tests, all playing. Toshack was the last man in and made two, accompanying Lindwall in a 20-run final wicket stand as Australia totalled 552.

After the MCC had reached 2/91, Toshack broke through the middle order. He had Compton caught behind by Don Tallon for 26, before trapping the incoming batsman Martin Donnelly—a New Zealand Test player—leg before wicket for five, and then having Hutton caught by vice-captain Lindsay Hassett for 52 a run later, leaving the hosts at 5/104. After the hosts recovered to 6/148, Toshack removed Test all rounder Ken Cranston, Test wicket-keeper Billy Griffith and spinner Jack Young to leave the MCC at 9/166. The MCC were eventually dismissed for 189, conceding a first innings lead of 363 runs. Toshack had taken 6/51 from 27 overs, and Bradman only allowed him four overs of rest. The Australian captain opted to enforce the follow on and allowed Toshack a lighter load in the second innings, bowling 15 overs and taking 1/43. He removed Edrich as the MCC fell for 205 in 60.2 overs to lose by an innings and 158 runs. Toshack had sent down the most overs by any Australian bowler in both innings. Bradman regarded Toshack's first innings performance as his best of the tour. Toshack again focused on the leg stump, which some English observers decried as being negative. However, former Australian Test batsman Jack Fingleton said that Toshack's line was close enough to leg stump that most balls had to be played.

In the next match against Lancashire, Toshack made four in Australia's 204, before claiming both openers after they had put on 48, including Test batsman Cyril Washbrook. Toshack ended with 2/40 as the match ended in a draw after the first day was washed out. It was Australia's first non-victory of the tour. After six consecutive matches in the space of 21 days, Toshack was rested for the next two matches against Nottinghamshire at Trent Bridge and Hampshire; the matches ended in a draw and an eight-wicket Australian win respectively.

Toshack returned for the final county match against Sussex before the First Test. He did not take a wicket but pinned down the local batsmen as Lindwall blasted them out with match figures of 11/59. Eight of Lindwall's victims had their stumps knocked over. Toshack bowled 15 overs for 23 runs in the first innings as the hosts were skittled for 86. He did not bat as Australia made 5/549 and then returned in the second innings for 17 overs that yielded only three scoring shots for a total of six runs. He finished the match with a total of 0/29 from 32 overs.

First Test

Toshack's performance in the First Test at Trent Bridge was a quiet one, taking a single wicket in each innings. England won the toss and elected to bat. Toshack trapped the home captain Norman Yardley leg before wicket with a ball that straightened after pitching, ending with 1/28 as England were bowled out for 165. Toshack then came to the wicket at 9/476 and was involved in an aggressive final wicket partnership of 33 with Johnston, scoring 19 runs—his best at Test level to date—in just 18 minutes, batting in a carefree and freewheeling manner, before falling lbw to Alec Bedser, ending Australia's innings on 509 with a 344-run lead.

During the second innings, Bradman thought that rain might come so he utilised Toshack to bowl defensive leg theory. He did so to slow the scoring so that England would not have a lead by the time the rain came to create a sticky wicket, otherwise Australia would have been forced to chase a target on a difficult pitch with irregular bounce and pace. As the umpires were obliged to not call off play unless the light was so poor as endanger the batsman, the lack of pace of Johnson and Toshack forced proceedings to continue as they posed no injury threat to the batsmen. Early on the fourth morning, Toshack were able to make the ball deviate regularly while bowling to Hutton and Denis Compton, but Bradman opted to have Miller take the new ball in the fifth over of the day as soon as it was available, taking Toshack off. Later, Toshack was used defensively while Miller attacked from the other end. Bradman's response to a boundary being hit from Toshack was to further stack the leg side with fielders in defensive positions, and scoring was slow as Toshack bowled accurately. Toshack took the wicket of Joe Hardstaff junior for 43, who holed out to Hassett on the leg side, having supported Denis Compton in a partnership of 93. The ball looped up in the air and travelled half-way to the square leg boundary, but Hassett managed to keep track of its trajectory through the fog. Toshack ended with 1/60 from 33 overs as Australia were one bowler short after an injury to Lindwall had prevented him from bowling since the first afternoon. England were bowled out for 441 and Australia reached the target of 98 with eight wickets in hand.

Toshack was rested for the first tour match after the First Test against Northamptonshire, which Australia won by an innings. He returned against Yorkshire at Bramall Lane, Sheffield, making four as Australia batted first and scored 249. He then recorded the best innings analysis of his first-class career, taking 7/81 from 40 consecutive overs, bemusing the Yorkshire spectators with his Australian accent and distinctive "Ow Wizz Ee" appealing. He removed both openers, including Hutton, and then bowled Yorkshire and England captain Norman Yardley to leave the hosts at 3/107. After Yorkshire reached 4/149, Toshack took four more wickets as the hosts collapsed to be all out for 206. Wicket-keeper Ron Saggers stood up to the wickets and stumped Ted Lester before Toshack removed three lower-order batsmen. Toshack did not bat or bowl again as the match petered into a draw. Bradman decided to bat until late on the third afternoon and secure a draw instead of pressing for a win; Yorkshire only batted for 27 overs in their second innings and the crowd booed Bradman for not pursuing a victory. With the match safe, Bradman elected to rely mainly on his second-choice bowlers to conserve his frontline bowlers' energy for the next Test.

Second Test

Australia won the toss and batted first in the Second Test at Lord's. They were on the back foot at 7/258 at stumps on the first day. On the second morning, the Australian lower order counter-attacked; Toshack joined Johnston with the score at 9/320 and they put on 30 runs before Johnston was stumped. Australia regained the momentum, adding 92 runs in 66 minutes of hitting in the morning. One sequence of two overs from Edrich was taken for 28 runs, with many balls unintentionally spooned over the slips or the covers. Both players swung wildly at the ball, which often went in vastly different directions to where they had aimed their shots. Both made new Test best scores; Toshack scored 20 not out. Both Johnston and Toshack—not known for their batting ability—played without inhibitions, joyfully revelling in their luck. England were then bowled out for 215. Toshack was wicketless, but was the most economical of the bowlers, conceding only 23 runs from his 18 overs. Toshack operated after the first new ball was taken, and as England had fallen to 4/46, they played him cautiously in an attempt to rebuild the innings. Australia then declared at 7/460 in their second innings with Toshack not required to bat, leaving England a target of 596.

England progressed to 1/52 in their run-chase before a double strike by Toshack. Edrich and Washbrook fell in quick succession to leave England at 3/65. Edrich edged to Johnson low down in the slips and Tallon took a difficult catch to remove Washbrook. Edrich decided to stand his ground after the catch was taken, thinking that he may have hit a bump ball into the ground before it flew to Johnson, but the umpire ruled otherwise and gave him out. Washbrook inside edged a Toshack full toss directly downwards at Tallon's ankle. Bradman described the catch as "miraculous" because Tallon had to reach so low, so quickly, in order to complete the catch. English commentator John Arlott speculated that Edrich and Washbrook may have lost concentration after Lindwall was replaced by Toshack, lulled into a false sense of security once Australia's leading bowler was no longer operating. England then recovered to be 3/106 at stumps on the fourth day.

Yardley and Tom Dollery took the score to 4/133 on the final morning before Toshack bowled the former for 11. He then trapped Alec Coxon two balls later in the same over for a duck, leaving England at 6/133. Coxon shuffled across his stumps and missed his first delivery, which hit him in front of the stumps and prompted a loud lbw appeal, and did the same thing to the next ball, and the umpire upheld the Australians' second appeal. During this spell, Toshack conceded only seven runs from eight overs, but was taken off as Bradman wanted to take the new ball and utilise Lindwall and Johnston. The match ended when Doug Wright hit Toshack to Lindwall and England were bowled out for 186, sealing a 409-run win for Australia. Toshack ended with 5/40 from 20.1 overs with Miller unable to bowl due to injury. During the second innings performance, Toshack employed two short legs and a silly mid-off. Arlott said that while Toshack had the best figures, Lindwall was the pivotal figure, at the latter "so patently disturbed Hutton he struck a blow at the morale of the English batting that was never overcome."

A match against Surrey started the day after the Second Test ended, but Bradman nevertheless asked Toshack to bowl 20 overs as Surrey batted first. He took 2/76 including opposition captain Errol Holmes. In reply to the hosts' 221, Toshack made one in Australia's total of 389. He then removed Arthur McIntyre and Eric Bedser in the second innings and ended with 2/29 as Australia won by ten wickets. Toshack was then rested after playing 12 days of cricket in two weeks, missing the innings victory over Gloucestershire.

Third Test

Toshack had a moderately successful Third Test, in which England elected to bat first. England lost two early wickets, and when Toshack came on, Jack Crapp repeatedly defended a sequence of deliveries to Arthur Morris at silly point. As the hosts were in trouble, they played cautiously and Toshack's first five overs were all maidens. Crapp then hit Toshack to Sid Barnes at short leg, but the catch was dropped. However, Crapp did not capitalise as Toshack conceded only eight runs in a sequence of eight overs.

Halfway through the day, England fell to 5/119, and captain Yardley came in. He hit Toshack in the air, but Barnes was unable to complete the reflex catch at short leg. However, this error did not cost many runs. Yardley lofted Toshack into the on-side and the hands of Johnson at forward square leg to fall for 22 with the score at 6/141. Toshack's defensive bowling had caused the English skipper to lose patience and his departure for 22 left the score on 141/6. Toshack bowled Dick Pollard late in the innings to finish with 2/75 from 41 overs—including 20 maidens—as England ended with 363. Toshack was unbeaten on zero and was only at the crease for one minute as Australia replied with 221. In the second innings, Toshack removed Compton for a duck, caught in the slips by Miller, and ended with 1/26 as the rain-affected match ended in a draw. He also had Washbrook dropped in the slips cordon by Johnson, one of several times that the batsman was reprieved during the innings.

After bowling 53 overs in the Third Test, Toshack was rested for the match against Middlesex. It was the only tour match before the Fourth Test, and Australia won by ten wickets.

Fourth Test

Toshack's knee injury flared again in the Fourth Test at Headingley after England elected to bat. On the first morning, England opener Len Hutton edged Toshack through the slips and was then dropped on 25. Hutton eventually reached 81 as the opening pair put on 168. Toshack was wicketless as the hosts closed the first day at 2/268. The following morning, he was removed from the attack after night-watchman Bedser hit him for three consecutive fours. After the lunch break, Toshack bowled Jack Crapp with an inside-edged half volley for five to leave England at 5/447. Toshack ended with an ineffective 1/112 from 35 overs as England made 496. He was the most expensive and uneconomical of the frontline bowlers and it was his most uneconomical performance in the Tests. He aggravated his knee injury and was later taken to London for cartilage surgery, ending his bowling duties for the match and his Test career.

Late on the third day, Toshack was part of a rearguard Australian action that minimised England's first innings lead. He came to the crease at 9/403 to accompany Lindwall, featuring in a 55-run stand and lasting the final 50 minutes until stumps, with Johnston running for him. Australia were 9/457 at stumps, with Lindwall on 76 and Toshack on 12. Lindwall farmed the strike by trying to hit boundaries and twos during the over, but Yardley did not resort to the tactic of setting a deep field to yield a single to Lindwall to get Toshack on strike. Despite Toshack and Johnston's lack of familiarity with having and acting as a runner respectively, and the resulting disorders in running between the wickets, Lindwall was able to manipulate the strike so that he faced most of the balls. On the next morning of play, Toshack did not add to his score before Lindwall was dismissed and Australia ended at 458 in the third over of the day, leaving the tourists 38 runs in arrears on the first innings. Toshack did not bowl in the second innings as England made 8/365 and set Australia a target of 404 for victory on the last day. Australia achieved the runs with seven wickets in hand, setting a new world record for the highest successful run-chase in Tests.

After the injury at Headingley, Toshack was out of action for two weeks, missing the matches against Derbyshire, Glamorgan and Warwickshire. These fixtures ended in an innings victory, a rain-affected draw and a nine-wicket win respectively. He returned against Lancashire and scored two in Australia's 321. He then bowled seven overs in the first innings, taking 0/17. He aggravated his injury and did not bowl in the second innings and did not play again for the tour. As a result, Toshack missed the last Test and eight further tour matches, three of which were not first-class. Australia won the Fifth Test by an innings in Toshack's absence to win the series 4–0, and proceeded through the remaining tour matches undefeated.

Role

A left-arm medium-pace seamer, Toshack was a member of Bradman's first-choice team and he played in the first four Tests before being struck down by a persistent knee injury. Toshack contained the English batsmen using leg theory in between the new ball bursts of Miller and Lindwall, usually bowling second change after Miller, Lindwall and Johnston. The English press decried Toshack's style of bowling as negative, but Jack Fingleton said that "he is generally so close to the stumps that nearly every ball has to be played".

During the Tests, Toshack took 11 wickets at 33.09; his most notable performance was his 5/40 in the second innings of the Second Test at Lord's. Of the four frontline pacemen, Toshack had the second best economy rate, although with his leg stump bowling, he also had a strike rate of 94.45, while the other three fast bowlers all had strike rates below 70. It was a similar tale in the first-class statistics, with the second best economy among the seven frontline bowlers, but the worst strike rate. For the entire tour, Toshack took 50 wickets at 21.12 with four five-wicket innings hauls, including a best of 7/81 against Yorkshire at Bramall Lane. He also took 6/51 in the first innings of the match against the Marylebone Cricket Club, which was almost entirely represented by English Test cricketers. Toshack took two catches on tour, none of them in the Tests.

An inept batsman with an average of 5.78 in his first-class career, Toshack managed a Test average of 51.00 on the 1948 tour after being dismissed only once, behind only Arthur Morris, Sid Barnes, Bradman and Neil Harvey. The unbeaten 20 he managed in the Lord's Test was his best first-class score, made in a freewheeling tenth-wicket stand with Johnston.

During the tour, Toshack had few opportunities with the bat, invariably being placed at either No. 10 and No. 11 in the order alongside Johnston, another tailender with little batting ability.N- Neither player ever passed 30 in their career, and they were the only two players who failed to make a half-century during the tour. As Australia's other specialist bowlers were Lindwall, McCool, Johnson and Doug Ring, all of whom made centuries and more than 18 fifties each during their first-class career, Toshack and Johnston were invariably rooted at the bottom of the order.  As Australia often won by an innings, and declared in the first innings many times due to their batting strength, Toshack only had 12 innings in his 15 first-class fixtures, never batted in the second innings, and scored 78 runs at 8.66. Of the 78 runs, 51 came from four Test innings in Toshack's four Tests.

Due to the fragility of his knee, Toshack was used sparingly in the tour games, playing in only 11 of the 29 non-Test matches on the tour, the least of any player. Toshack was unable to play in the last nine matches of the tour, having injured himself in the second match against Lancashire.

See also
 1948 Ashes series

Notes

Statistical note

n-[1]

This statement can be verified by consulting all of the scorecards for the matches, as listed here.

General notes

References

 

The Invincibles (cricket)